Felling is a Tyne and Wear Metro station, serving the suburb of Felling, Gateshead in Tyne and Wear, England. It joined the network on 15 November 1981, following the opening of the third phase of the network, between Haymarket and Heworth.

History 
The station was originally built for the Brandling Junction Railway, opening on 30 December 1839. On 18 November 1896, the station was resited to the site of the present station. The original Brandling Junction Railway station building is still extant on the north side of the line.

In November 1979, British Rail stations at Felling and Pelaw were closed, following the opening of the new interchange station at Heworth. At this time, British Rail trains were concentrated on the formerly freight-only northern pair of tracks here, leaving the southern pair available for use by the Tyne and Wear Metro. Felling re-opened as part of the Tyne and Wear Metro network in November 1981, with Pelaw re-opening in September 1985 – almost six years after the closure of the British Rail station.

Accidents and incidents
On 26 March 1907, an express passenger train from Leeds to Newcastle was derailed while running between Heworth signal box and Felling station. Eight people were seriously injured, two of whom later died.

Facilities
Step-free access is available at all stations across the Tyne and Wear Metro network, with ramps providing step-free access to platforms at Felling. The station was refurbished in 2015, along with Gateshead Stadium, and is branded in the new black and white corporate colour scheme. The station is equipped with ticket machines, waiting shelter, seating, next train information displays, timetable posters, and an emergency help point. Ticket machines are able to accept payment with credit and debit card (including contactless payment), notes and coins. The station is also fitted with smartcard validators, which feature at all stations across the network.

A small car park is available, on Sunderland Road, with 27 parking spaces, plus three accessible spaces. There is also the provision for cycle parking, with four cycle pods and four cycle lockers available for use.

Services 
, the station is served by up to ten trains per hour on weekdays and Saturday, and up to eight trains per hour during the evening and on Sunday.

Rolling stock used: Class 599 Metrocar

References

External links
 
 Timetable and station information for Felling

Railway stations in Great Britain opened in 1839
Railway stations in Great Britain closed in 1979
Railway stations in Great Britain opened in 1981
Former North Eastern Railway (UK) stations